Selset Reservoir is a reservoir in County Durham, England. It supplies water for Teesdale and is owned by Northumbrian Water. It was built in 1960 and its main use (apart from water supply) is sailing.

See also
 List of reservoirs and dams in the United Kingdom

Drinking water reservoirs in England
Reservoirs in County Durham